Pepkrakte Jakukreikapiti Ronore Konxarti (born 5 August 1966), best known as Zeca Gavião is a Brazilian football manager, currently in charge of Gavião Kyikatejê Futebol Clube. He also acts as the club's president.

References

1966 births
Living people
Sportspeople from Pará
Brazilian football managers
Brazilian people of indigenous peoples descent